The Bureau of International Security and Nonproliferation (ISN) is a bureau within the United States Department of State responsible for managing a broad range of nonproliferation and counterproliferation functions. The bureau leads U.S. efforts to prevent the spread of weapons of mass destruction (nuclear, chemical, and biological weapons) and their delivery systems.

It was created on September 13, 2005 when the Bureau of Arms Control and the Bureau of Nonproliferation were merged. Stephen G. Rademaker was the first the Acting Assistant Secretary of State for International Security and Nonproliferation. He had been the Assistant Secretary for the Bureau of Arms Control, and in February 2005 he was named the head of the Bureau for Nonproliferation pending the two bureaus' merger.

The Bureau's role within the Department of State is to spearhead efforts to promote international consensus on WMD proliferation through bilateral and multilateral diplomacy, and to address WMD proliferation threats posed by non-state actors and terrorist groups by improving physical security, using interdiction and sanctions, and actively participating in the Proliferation Security Initiative.

It also coordinates the implementation of international treaties and arrangements. It seeks to work with international organizations such as the United Nations, the G7, NATO, and the International Atomic Energy Agency to reduce and eliminate threats posed by weapons of mass destruction, and to support foreign partners in their efforts.

During its time as an independent Bureau, the Bureau of Arms Control led efforts to negotiate new arms control agreements, such as the May 2002 Moscow Treaty on strategic offensive reductions, as well as ongoing efforts in the Geneva Conference on Disarmament (CD). It also had responsibilities of implementing existing agreements such as the Intermediate-Range Nuclear Forces Treaty, START I, the Chemical Weapons Convention, the Moscow Treaty, the Biological Weapons Convention.

It held the lead for negotiations and policy development of the Treaty on Conventional Armed Forces in Europe, the Treaty on Open Skies, arms control elements of the Dayton peace accords, and other European conventional arms control issues. In early 2004, the office responsible for the Confidence and Security-Building Measures in the Organization for Security and Co-operation in Europe had been moved from the Bureau of Political-Military Affairs to the Bureau of Arms Control.

Organization
In addition to the Assistant Secretary, the bureau is overseen by four Deputy Assistant Secretaries, who supervise thirteen unique offices.

Principal Deputy Assistant Secretary for International Security and Nonproliferation 
Office of Congressional and Public Affairs
Office of Critical Technology Protection
Office of Policy Coordination
Deputy Assistant Secretary for Nonproliferation Policy
Biological Policy Staff
Office of Multilateral Nuclear and Security Affairs
Office of Nuclear Energy, Safety, and Security
Deputy Assistant Secretary for International Security Policy
Office of Conventional Arms Threat Reduction
Office of Counterproliferation Initiatives
Office of Missile, Biological, and Chemical Nonproliferation
Deputy Assistant Secretary for International Security and Nonproliferation Programs
Office of Cooperative Threat Reduction
Office of Export Control Cooperation
Office of Nonproliferation and Disarmament Fund
Office of Weapons of Mass Destruction Terrorism

The bureau also includes the Special Representative for the Biological Weapons Convention and the U.S. Special Representative for Nuclear Nonproliferation.

References

External links
 

Arms control
Nuclear proliferation
ISN
Government agencies established in 2005